Vigroids (formerly Nigroids) was the brand name of a liquorice sweet. The small black pellets were particularly marketed as an expectorant lozenge for singers, using the slogan "for clarity of voice". The product was manufactured by Ernest Jackson & Company Ltd of Crediton in Devon, England, a subsidiary of Kraft Foods.

The principal ingredient of Vigroids is liquorice block juice. The company warns that liquorice can raise blood pressure, and that those with a history of hypertension should not take too many. They suggest limiting consumption to 10 per day.  No sugar is used. Small quantities of other flavourings such as menthol, eucalyptus and peppermint are added to help the pellets act as a breath mint.

History
Nigroids were invented by Ferris & Co. Ltd., manufacturing chemists of Bristol, England, in 1900. The company promoted them with the slogan:
 For Hoarseness, "Tickling of the Throat," etc. They afford protection to the Voice, Throat, and Chest, against ill-effects of fog, cold and damp. Invaluable to singers and speakers.

Ernest Jackson acquired the brand in 1974. In November 2010 the name was changed from "Nigroids" to "Vigroids".

As of 2016, the product appears to have been withdrawn, with no retailers listed as stocking it. The product no longer features as a brand on the Ernest Jackson website.

See also
 List of breath mints
 Victory V
 Fisherman's Friend
 Apteekin Salmiakki

References

External links
 Archived Vigroids page for manufacturer

Brand name confectionery
Breath mints
Throat lozenges
Kraft Foods brands
British confectionery
British brands
Cadbury
Liquorice (confectionery)